Hollywood is a neighborhood on the north side of Memphis, Tennessee, United States.

References

Neighborhoods in Memphis, Tennessee